Jared Terrell (born February 10, 1995) is an American professional basketball player for Hapoel Eilat of the Israeli Basketball Premier League. He played college basketball for the University of Rhode Island.

High school career
Terrell is a native of Weymouth, Massachusetts and has two brothers, Royce II and Jordan. He began his high school career at Weymouth High School, where he averaged 11 points a game. He made big strides as a sophomore and posted 16 points per game and helped Weymouth to a Bay State Conference Carey Division title with an 18-4 record. The next season, Terrell transferred to the New Hampton School, where one of his teammates was Noah Vonleh. His time at New Hampton was marred by injuries and he transferred again to Brewster Academy, where he was teammates with Devonte' Graham. During two years at Brewster, Terrell averaged 14.5 points, 5.0 rebounds and 3.0 assists. He guided the team to a New England prep title in 2013 and 2014 and was named the MVP of the tournament. Terrell led Brewster to their third National Prep Championship in 2014. Terrell formed a dangerous backcourt at Brewster, which consisted of two other future NBA players in Devonte' Graham and Donovan Mitchel. Terrell was highly recruited out of high school and accepted a scholarship to Oklahoma State before changing his mind and picking Rhode Island.

College career
Despite posting four consecutive losing seasons before Terrell arrived, the Rams finished 23-10 his freshman year and reached the NIT. He was named to the All-Atlantic 10 Rookie Team. As a sophomore, he averaged 13.6 points per game on a 17-15 team. Terrell's scoring went down somewhat as a junior to 12.6 points per game, but the Rams finished 25-10 and reached the NCAA Tournament.

Terrell had a son, Jared Jr. in September 2017. On November 27, Terrell had a career-high 32 points in a 75-74 win over Seton Hall and hit the game-winning layup with 5.2 seconds left. As a senior, he led Rhode Island in scoring with 16.8 points per game. He was named to the First Team All-Atlantic 10 as a senior. Terrell led the Rams to 26-8 record and an NCAA Tournament appearance, where they beat Oklahoma behind 13 points from Terrell. Rhode Island bowed out in the second round to Duke despite Terrell contributing 10 points.

Professional career
Terrell went undrafted in the 2018 NBA draft but was signed by the Minnesota Timberwolves to a two-way contract with the Iowa Wolves of the G League shortly thereafter. Terrell made his NBA debut on November 4, 2018 against the Portland Trail Blazers, playing 21 minutes and scoring four points off 1-8 shooting in a 111-81 loss.

On September 14, 2019, Terrell signed a one-year deal with Hapoel Eilat of the Israeli Premier League. On October 28, 2019, Terrell recorded a season-high 25 points, while shooting 8-of-15 from the field, along with four rebounds in an 87–76 win over Maccabi Haifa. On December 20, 2019, he parted ways with Eilat after appearing in six games due to an injury.

On January 7, 2020, Terrell signed with Dnipro of the Ukrainian Basketball SuperLeague for the rest of the season. Terrell was named to the "USA/EU" team of the Ukrainian Basketball SuperLeague All-Star Game.

On January 7, 2022, Terrell signed with Türk Telekom of the Basketball Super League.

On August 15, 2022, he has signed with Hapoel Eilat of the Israeli Basketball Premier League.

Career statistics

NBA

Regular season

|-
| align="left" | 
| align="left" | Minnesota
| 14 || 0 || 7.9 || .308 || .235 || .500 || .4 || .9 || .2 || .1 || 2.2
|-
| style="text-align:center;" colspan="2"| Career
| 14 || 0 || 7.9 || .308 || .235 || .500 || .4 || .9 || .2 || .1 || 2.2

College

|-
| style="text-align:left;"| 2014–15
| style="text-align:left;"| Rhode Island
| 33 || 31 || 27.1 || .371 ||.319 || .714 || 2.4 || 1.5 || 1.3 || .1 || 9.2
|-
| style="text-align:left;"| 2015–16
| style="text-align:left;"| Rhode Island
| 32 || 32 || 35.5 || .397 || .347 || .750 || 3.4 || 2.6 || 1.1 || .2 || 13.6
|-
| style="text-align:left;"| 2016–17
| style="text-align:left;"| Rhode Island
| 35 || 34 || 30.7 || .419 || .346 || .750 || 2.9 || 2.0 || 1.0 || .1 || 12.6
|-
| style="text-align:left;"| 2017–18
| style="text-align:left;"| Rhode Island
| 34 || 34 || 33.2 || .427 || .414 || .821 || 3.5 || 2.4 || 1.5 || .2 || 16.8
|-
|- class="sortbottom"
| style="text-align:center;" colspan="2" | Career
| 134 || 131 || 31.6 || .406 || .365 || .763 || 3.0 || 2.1 || 1.2 || .1 || 13.0

Source: RealGM

References

External links
Rhode Island Rams bio 
RealGM profile

1995 births
Living people
American expatriate basketball people in Israel
American expatriate basketball people in Ukraine
American men's basketball players
Basketball players from Massachusetts
BC Dnipro players
Brewster Academy alumni
Hapoel Eilat basketball players
Iowa Wolves players
Minnesota Timberwolves players
Rhode Island Rams men's basketball players
Shooting guards
Sportspeople from Weymouth, Massachusetts
Türk Telekom B.K. players
Undrafted National Basketball Association players
New Hampton School alumni